Steve Katsos is an American TV personality and  host of The Steve Katsos Show, a television show based out of Arlington, Massachusetts. The show has earned national recognition, including winning the Hometown Video Award from the Alliance for Community Media.
 
The show was started as volunteers helping struggling artists and as of 2011, airs in over 13 million homes weekly in the US and Europe, aired on several stations worldwide such as WBIN-TV, in the U.K. and Ireland on My Channel, My TV, AcMI.

Guests of the Steve Katsos Show have ranged from budding local musicians such as Will Dailey & The Rivals, The Luxury and The Self-Proclaimed Rockstars, artists and comedians such as Lenny Clarke, Jimmy Tingle and Mike Koutrobis to established celebrities and personalities such as Candy O'Terry, Joe Wong, Rick Dumont, Dave Zeltserman, Governor Michael Dukakis and even sitting Governor Deval Patrick, and many others.

Katsos regularly puts on benefit shows for charitable causes such as The Jimmy Fund and Autism Speaks.

References

External links
 The Steve Katsos Show (Official Website)
 WGBH Interview with Steve Katsos
 Boston Herald article on Steve Katsos
 Steve Katsos- Arlington Advocate Newspaper
 Steve Katsos- IMDB
 Steve Katsos on Crosswinds KFNH
 Governor Michael Dukakis on Steve Katsos
 ACMI National Video Awards

American television talk show hosts
Living people
People from Arlington, Massachusetts
Year of birth missing (living people)